Lucienne Legrand (5 May 1900 – 22 October 1987) was a French film actress of the silent era. She frequently worked with her husband the actor and director Émile-Bernard Donatien. She should not be confused with the later actress Lucienne Legrand (1920–2022).

Selected filmography
 Happy Couple (1923)
 Princesse Lulu (1925)
 Simone (1926)
 The Martyrdom of Saint Maxence (1928)

References

Bibliography
 Rège, Philippe. Encyclopedia of French Film Directors, Volume 1. Scarecrow Press, 2009.

External links

1900 births
1987 deaths
20th-century French actresses
Actresses from Paris
French film actresses
French silent film actresses
People from Saint-Cloud